Arnaud Bingo (born 12 October 1987) is a professional handballer who plays for Sporting CP.

References

1987 births
Living people
Sportspeople from Lyon
French male handball players
Sporting CP handball players